Arumugam Mohanasundaram (8 February 1928 – 16 September 2012), popularly known as Loose Mohan and Raja Gopalakrishnan, was an Indian actor who had acted as a comedian in over 1000 Tamil films. He is credited with popularizing Madras Bashai, a Cockney of Tamil language spoken in Chennai city.

Early life 
Born in Kanchipuram, son of old actor "Loose Arumugam", Mohan migrated to Madras at an early age and debuted at age 16 in the 1944 film Harichandra as P. U. Chinnappa's son. However, most of his successes were in the late 1970s and 1980s when he acted as a comedian alongside stars such as Kamal Haasan and Rajinikanth.

Career 
He acted as servant in the movie "Kaththiruntha Kangal" 1962 film with Savithri and Gemini Ganesan. His breakthrough movie as a comedian was the 1979 film Rosapoo Ravikaikari, after which he acted in more than 1000 films, including four movies in Marathi and one each in Bhojpuri, Hindi and Tulu. In 2000, Mohan was awarded the Kalaimamani award by the Government of Tamil Nadu.

Filmography 
This is a partial filmography. You can expand it.

Later life and death 
Mohan acted in his last film role in 2002 (Azhagi). He was forced to quit acting due to his deteriorating health. In 2009, Mohan filed a case against his son Karthik for neglecting his health. He died on 16 September 2012, aged 84, from respiratory problems.

References

Sources

External links 

1928 births
2012 deaths
Deaths from respiratory failure
Indian male film actors
Male actors in Marathi cinema
People from Kanchipuram district
Recipients of the Kalaimamani Award
Tamil comedians